Sulikatti is a village in Dharwad district of Karnataka, India.

Demographics 
As of the 2011 Census of India there were 188 households in Sulikatti and a total population of 929 consisting of 470 males and 459 females. There were 125 children ages 0-6.

References

Villages in Dharwad district